Mauganj is a District and Nagar Panchayat in the Indian state of Madhya Pradesh. Bagheli is the regional language of Mauganj. Mauganj is the seat of legislative assembly in Madhya Pradesh. Its nearest towns are Manikwar,Hanumana,Deotalab,Naigadhi.The process of making Mauganj a new district is going on.

of Mauganj dates back to the eleventh century starting with the advent of the Sengar clan of Rajputs into this fertile region located in North-Eastern Madhya Pradesh. It was previously known as 'Mau Raj' under the rule of the Sengar kings who settled down in the region and laid construction of forts in Mauganj, Mangawan and Bicchrahta.

The Sengar arrived in the region from Jalaun and ruled this little kingdom and famously defended it from the Kalachuris. However, at some point in the fourteenth century, the Baghelas invaded Mau Raj. They defeated the Sengars in the battle of Mau and destroyed their fort and ultimately annexed it to the kingdom of Bagelkhand. The scions of Sengars later eloped and constructed a new fortress and named it Nai Garhi which literally means 'a new fortress'.

Geography
It has an average elevation of 313 metres (1,026 feet).
Mauganj is 65 km from Rewa District Headquarter.

Some sites of religious significance around Mauganj are:
 
 Mahadev Temple in Devatalab (17 km from Mauganj)
 Shree Hanuman Temple, Deodhara (16 km SW of Mauganj)
 Asht Bhuji temple
 Hanuman Mandir, Gytri Mandir, Ram Janki Mandir and Alopan Mandir
 Bauli Hanuman Ji Mandir (Manikwar)
 Thadi Pathar Devi Mandir (Bavangarh)25 Km From Mauganj

Demographics
 India census, Mauganj had a population of 22,989. Males constitute 52% of the population and females 48%. Mauganj has an average literacy rate of 52%, lower than the national average of 59.5%: male literacy is 63%, and female literacy is 41%. In Mauganj, 18% of the population is under 6 years of age.

Transport

By air
Nearest airport is in Prayagraj, Uttar Pradesh.

By bus
Bus stand is available in the city bus stand Mauganj.

By Train
Nearest railway station is Rewa Station (Madhya Pradesh)

References

Cities and towns in Rewa district